Valentina Galiano (born ) is an Argentine volleyball player. She is part of the Argentina women's national volleyball team.

She participated in the 2018 FIVB Volleyball Women's World Championship,

At club level she played for Boca Juniors in 2018.

References

External links 
 FIVB profile
 https://www.cochabamba2018.bo/deportista/atleta/22262#/ficha/22262
 http://japan2018.fivb.com/en/schedule/9187-argentina-netherlands/post
 http://www.feva.org.ar/noticias/muestra_nota.php?categoria=categoria_ingles&id=8706
 http://www.norceca.net/2018%20Events/XVII%20Women%20PanCup-2018/Calendar-P-2-3/P-3%20for%20match%204_%20ARG-COL.pdf

1989 births
Living people
Argentine women's volleyball players
Place of birth missing (living people)
Pan American Games medalists in volleyball
Pan American Games bronze medalists for Argentina
Volleyball players at the 2019 Pan American Games
Medalists at the 2019 Pan American Games
21st-century Argentine women